Roger Michelot (8 June 1912 in Saint-Dizier, Haute-Marne – 19 March 1993) was a French boxer who competed at the 1932 Summer Olympics and the 1936 Summer Olympics. In 1936 he won the gold medal in the light heavyweight class after winning the final against Richard Vogt. Born in Saint-Dizier, Haute-Marne he also competed at the 1932 Summer Olympics.

1932 Olympic results
Below is the record of Roger Michelot, a French middleweight boxer who competed at the 1932 Los Angeles Olympics:

 Round of 16: defeated Louis Lavoie (Canada) on points
 Quarterfinal: defeated Hans Bernlohr (Germany) on points
 Semifinal: lost to Amado Azar (Argentina) on points
 Bronze-Medal Bout: lost to Ernest Peirce (South Africa) by walkover

1936 Olympics record
Below is the record of Roger Michelot of France at the 1936 Berlin Olympics.  Michelot competed in the light heavyweight boxing division and won the gold medal:

 Round of 32: bye
 Round of 16: bye
 Quarterfinal:  defeated Borge Soren Jorgenson Holm (Denmark) on points
 Semifinal: defeated Robey Leibbrant (South Africa) on points
 Final: defeated Richard Vogt (Germany) on points (won gold medal)

References
 Olympic profile

1912 births
1993 deaths
People from Saint-Dizier
Light-heavyweight boxers
Olympic boxers of France
Boxers at the 1932 Summer Olympics
Boxers at the 1936 Summer Olympics
Olympic gold medalists for France
Olympic medalists in boxing
Medalists at the 1936 Summer Olympics
French male boxers
Sportspeople from Haute-Marne